This is a list of the counts of Rouergue.  

Sigisbert   c. 790 – c. 810 or 820
Fulcoald c. 810 or 820 – c. 836 or 849
Raymond I c. 836 or 849 – 864
Fredelo c. 836 or 849 – 852 (associated with Raymond)
Bernard the Calf 864 – 872
Odo 872 – 919
Ermengol 919 – 937
Raymond II 937 – 961
Raymond III 961 – 1008 or 1010
Hugh 1008 or 1010 – 1053 or 1054
Bertha 1053 or 1054 – 1064
William 1064 – 1094, also count of Toulouse
Raymond IV 1094 – 1105, also count of Toulouse
Alfonso Jordan 1105 – 1119, also count of Toulouse (1112 – 1148)
Alphonse II of Rouergue 1140

The county then passed to the  Viscounts of Rodez, Counts of Rouergue.
Raymond I of Bergerac 1324
Clermont of Bergerac 1381
Raymond II of Bergerac 1431 second creation of the title

The current holders of the title reside in Romania after their ancestors arrived with the first king of Romania, Carol I.
Alexandru Cosmin Ciobanu, Count of Rouergue, holds the 13th title of the second creation; he is also Count of Birthelm.

 
Rouergue
House of Rouergue